St Anne's Church, Duddeston is a former Church of England parish church in Ashted, Birmingham.

History

The foundation stone was laid on 25 June 1868. The church was erected by William J Briley of Birmingham and was consecrated in 1869.

A parish was assigned of St Matthew's Church, Duddeston and Nechells in 1896.

When the church closed in 1951, the parish was merged back into that of St Matthew's Church, Duddeston and Nechells.

Organ

An organ by Whittaker of Ashton-under-Lyne was installed at a cost of £200 and opened on 17 March 1872 by a recital from Stephen Samuel Stratton, organist of St Bartholomew's Church, Edgbaston. Later it was replaced by an instrument from Sheffields Organ Builders. A specification of the organ can be found on the National Pipe Organ Register. When St Anne's closed, the organ was moved to St Boniface's Church, Quinton.

References

Church of England church buildings in Birmingham, West Midlands
Churches completed in 1869
1869 establishments in England